Santiago Nathaniel Ryce Samaniego (born January 25, 1974) is a Panamanian former boxer who competed from 1993 to 2007, with a comeback in 2011.

Background 
Samaniego is a first cousin of Roberto Durán.

Professional career 
Nicknamed "El Herrero", Samaniego turned pro in 1993, and in 1997 took on undefeated Mihai Leu for the Vacant WBO Welterweight Title, but lost a decision.  In 2002 he faced Mamadou Thiam for the interim WBA Light Middleweight Title, and won in a 12th round stoppage.  In 2003, he was TKO'd by Alejandro García, losing the belt. Since the loss, he dropped fights to Rhoshii Wells and Sechew Powell

See also 
List of light middleweight boxing champions

External links

|-

|-

1974 births
Light-middleweight boxers
Living people
World Boxing Association champions
Panamanian male boxers